Boris Becker defeated Petr Korda 6–2, 3–6, 6–3 to win the 1994 Milan Indoor singles event. Becker defended his title from 1993.

Seeds

Draws

Key
Q - Qualifier
WC - Wild Card

Finals

Section 1

Section 2

External links
 Singles draw

Singles
Milan Indoor - Singles, 1994